Lapwood is a surname. Notable people with the surname include:

Anna Lapwood (born 1995), British organist, conductor, and broadcaster
Doug Lapwood, New Zealand association football player
Harry Lapwood (1915–2007), New Zealand soldier and politician

See also
Larwood